Racket sports are games in which players use a racket or paddle to hit a ball or other object.  Rackets consist of a handled frame with an open hoop that supports a network of tightly stretched strings. Paddles have a solid face rather than a network of strings, but may be perforated with a pattern of holes, or be covered with some form of textured surface.

Sports that use a netted racket
 Badminton
 Ball badminton
 Frontenis
 Battledore and shuttlecock
 Crossminton (previously "Speedminton")
 Qianball
 Racketlon (a series of other racket and paddle sports)
 Rackets
 Real tennis
 Road tennis
 Soft tennis
 Speed-ball
 Squash
 Hardball squash
 Squash tennis
 Stické
 Tennis
 Tennis polo
 Touchtennis
 Lawn Tennis

Sports that use a non-netted racket, or paddle
 Basque pelota
 Beach tennis
 Downside ball game
 Four wall paddleball
 Frescotennis
 Jokari
 Matkot
 Miniten
 One wall paddleball
 Paddle ball
 Paddle tennis
 Padel
 Paleta Frontón
 Pan Pong
 Pelota mixteca
 Pickleball
 Pitton
 Platform tennis
 Racquetball
 Spec Tennis
 Sphairee
 Stoolball
 Table squash
 Table tennis (Ping Pong)
 Tamburello
 Totem tennis

References

Sport-related lists by sport